Dexter Eugene McNabb (born July 9, 1969) is an American former college and professional football player who was a fullback in the National Football League (NFL) for three seasons during the 1990s.  McNabb played college football for the University of Florida, and thereafter, he played professionally for the Green Bay Packers and the Philadelphia Eagles of the NFL.

Early years

McNabb was born in DeFuniak Springs, Florida.  He attended Walton High School in DeFuniak Springs, and played high school football for the Walton Braves.

College career 

McNabb accepted an athletic scholarship to attend the University of Florida in Gainesville, Florida, where he played for coach Galen Hall and coach Steve Spurrier's Florida Gators football teams from 1988 to 1991.  During McNabb's senior season in 1991, the Gators won their first official Southeastern Conference (SEC) football championship.

Professional career 

After a year away from the NFL, he spent the  season with the Philadelphia Eagles. McNabb played in thirty-three regular season NFL games, mainly as a blocking fullback for the Packers and Eagles, and received few carries.

Life after football 

After his NFL career was over, McNabb returned to Gainesville and graduated from the University of Florida with bachelor's degree in sociology in 2003.  In 2010, he worked as an associate principal at Pulaski High School in Pulaski, Wisconsin.  McNabb previously worked as an administrator for at-risk students at West De Pere High School in West De Pere, Wisconsin, where he also served as an assistant football coach and Head girls' track and field coach for the West De Pere Phantoms.  From 2013-present, McNabb serves as the associate principal of Green Bay West High School.

See also 

 Florida Gators football, 1980–89
 Florida Gators football, 1990–99
 List of Florida Gators in the NFL Draft
 List of Green Bay Packers players
 List of Philadelphia Eagles players
 List of University of Florida alumni

References 

1969 births
Living people
People from DeFuniak Springs, Florida
Players of American football from Florida
American football fullbacks
Florida Gators football players
Walton High School (DeFuniak Springs, Florida) alumni
Green Bay Packers players
Philadelphia Eagles players